Atang Senjaya Airport or Atang Senjaya Airbase is a small airbase operated by Indonesian Air Force. Located at Atang Senjaya, Kemang, Bogor Regency, West Java, Indonesia, this airport has a single runway lane of 1.400 m. The airport is named after an Indonesian aviation pioneer from West Java, Atang Sendjaja. It is the main base of 4th Air Wing (helicopter squadrons), General Education Wing and Atang Senjaya Air Force Hospital.

References

Indonesian Air Force bases
Airports in West Java
Transport in West Java